Songlines  is the debut album by Irish traditional singer Karan Casey.

Track listing
 Roger the Miller
 She Is Like the Swallow
 Ballad of Accounting
 Shamrock Shore
 Martinmas Time			
 Buachaillin Ban	
 Creggan White Hare
 Song of Wandering Aengus (W. B. Yeats, Travis Edmonson)
 One, I Love	
 World Turned Upside Down (The Digger's Song)	
 Labouring Man's Daughter

External links
 Official website

1997 albums
Karan Casey albums
Shanachie Records albums